See Mercedes-Benz S-Class for a complete overview of all S-Class models.
The Mercedes-Benz W189 model 300 was a four-door luxury tourer produced by Mercedes-Benz between 1957 and 1962. It was the company's flagship model at the time, equivalent to the modern S-Class and Maybach.

Marketed as the Type 300d, it was equal in features and price but superior in performance to the rival Rolls-Royce Silver Cloud. Favored by statesmen and business leaders, it offered options such as a glass partition, VHF mobile telephone, and dictation machine.

All but hand-built as the company flagship, the 300d is often colloquially referred to as the Adenauer, after Konrad Adenauer, the first Chancellor of Germany (then West Germany) who employed six custom cabriolet, hardtop saloon, and landaulet versions of the W189 and its precursor W186 series during his tenure. Among the custom features in these "parade cars" were writing desks, sirens, curtains, dividing partitions, sunroofs, and half-roof "landaulet" configurations.

Technologically advanced, the fuel injected  3.0 L inline-6 "Type 300" was regarded as a "driver's" car, sharing numerous design innovations and mechanical components with the iconic Mercedes-Benz 300 SL "Gullwing", including engine, suspension, and chassis.  It was succeeded by the 6 L W100 Mercedes-Benz 600 Grosser Mercedes in 1963.

300d

A successor to Mercedes' flagship W186 series final model, the 300c, the enlarged 300d (W189) was introduced in August 1957. Its new chassis code reflected sweeping  refinements that included modernized bodywork, pioneering fuel injection, and a unique hardtop configuration transforming it into a pillarless phaeton.

Available as both a saloon and cabriolet, it retained the W186's proven X-frame chassis and was fitted with a more powerful version of its 3.0 L (2996 cc/182 in³) overhead cam, aluminum head M186 straight-6, the M189.

This shared improvements proven in the iconic 300SL "Gull Wing", the fastest production car of its day, including Bosch mechanical direct injection and an innovative diagonal head-to-block joint that allowed for oversized intake and exhaust valves. Output was an even horsepower per cubic inch,  at 5500 rpm.

Designed to give reliable service under prolonged hard use, the engine featured deep water jackets, thermostatically controlled oil cooling, copper-lead bearings and a hardened crankshaft. A 3-speed Borg-Warner automatic transmission was standard. With no natural cruising speed, the car could sustain anything up to its maximum speed all day, road conditions permitting.

The combination of a rigid X-shaped ovoid steel tube frame and four-wheel independent suspension provided surprisingly nimble handling. Double wishbones, coil springs, and a stabilizer bar were used up front, and Mercedes' typical double coil spring swing axle in rear. An innovative dashboard-operated rear load-leveling suspension engaged a torsion bar to increase stiffness by one-third when needed, and a pedal-operated central lubrication system kept friction points silent. Brakes were vacuum-assisted hydraulic drum all around, steering recirculating ball. Power steering and Artic-Kar air-conditioning were new options.

An additional 4 inches of wheelbase provided greater rear legroom, equaling that of the long wheelbase model Rolls-Royce Silver Cloud also introduced that year. Removable rear quarter lights allowed an unobstructed view in and out from the front vent window on back, much valued in the model's popular role as a "parade car".

A total of 3,077 300d models (priced at DM 27,000) was produced through March 1962, along with 65 special-order 300d-based Cabriolet Ds (DM 35,500). After some overlap with the smaller, more contemporary styled W112 chassied 300SE that shared its engine, the 300d limousine was ultimately replaced as company flagship in 1963 by the 600 pullman "Grand Mercedes".

See also
 Mercedes-Benz 300 Sc

References

Notes

Bibliography

External links

W189